James L. Foreman (May 12, 1927 – June 3, 2012) was a United States district judge of the United States District Court for the Eastern District of Illinois and of the United States District Court for the Southern District of Illinois.

Education and career

Born in Metropolis, Illinois, Foreman was in the United States Navy from 1945 to 1946. He received a Bachelor of Science degree from the University of Illinois at Urbana–Champaign in 1950, and a Juris Doctor from the University of Illinois College of Law in 1952. From 1952 to 1972, he was in private practice in Metropolis. He was the assistant state attorney general of Illinois from 1953 to 1960, and then a state's attorney of Massac County, Illinois until 1964.

Federal judicial service

On February 16, 1972, Foreman was nominated by President Richard Nixon to a seat on the United States District Court for the Eastern District of Illinois vacated by Judge William George Juergens. Foreman was confirmed by the United States Senate on March 2, 1972, and received his commission on March 7, 1972. He served as Chief Judge from 1978 until March 31, 1979, when the districts of Illinois were reorganized and he was reassigned by operation of law to the United States District Court for the Southern District of Illinois. He then served as Chief Judge of his new district until 1992, assuming senior status on June 1, 1992, and assuming inactive senior status May 12, 2007.  He died on June 3, 2012, in Paducah, Kentucky.

References

Sources
 

1927 births
2012 deaths
Judges of the United States District Court for the Eastern District of Illinois
Judges of the United States District Court for the Southern District of Illinois
United States district court judges appointed by Richard Nixon
20th-century American judges
People from Metropolis, Illinois
Military personnel from Illinois
University of Illinois College of Law alumni